Caloranaerobacter is a Gram-negative, thermophilic, anaerobic and chemoorganotrophic bacterial genus from the family of Clostridiaceae.

References

Further reading 
 
 <
 
 
 

Clostridiaceae
Bacteria genera